Gang in Blue is a 1996 American television film co-directed by Melvin Van Peebles and his son, Mario Van Peebles, about a black police officer who discovers a cell of white supremacist vigilantes within his department.

Cast
 Mario Van Peebles as Michael Rhodes
 Josh Brolin as Keith DeBruler
 Melvin Van Peebles as Andre Speier
 Cynda Williams as Anita Boyard
 Stephen Lang as "Moose" Tavola
 J. T. Walsh as Lieutenant William Eyler
 Sean McCann as Clute Mirkovich
 Zach Grenier as Joe Beckstrem

External links

1996 films
1996 crime drama films
1990s police films
American crime drama films
American police films
1990s English-language films
Films about race and ethnicity
Films directed by Mario Van Peebles
Films directed by Melvin Van Peebles
American vigilante films
Films about corruption in the United States
1990s American films